Nick's Famous Coney Island is a restaurant in Portland, Oregon, United States.

Description
Andi Prewitt of Willamette Week has described Nick's as Hawthorne's "most iconic hot dog bar", most known for its "chili-and-onion-smothered franks".

History
Nick Carlascio opened Nick's Famous Coney Island in 1935, and relocated to its current location in 1942. Frank Nudo, who worked at the restaurant, purchased Nick's in 1960. He retired in 2008, and died in 2017.

Dave Bertelo and Nick Brown purchased the business in 2019. They painted the interior during the COVID-19 pandemic.

Reception
Erin DeJesus of Eater Portland included the restaurant's Coney Island Dog in her 2014 list of "18 of Portland's Iconic Meat Dishes". In The Oregonian 2020 list of Portland's 40 best inexpensive restaurants", Michael Russell wrote, "It's easy to love Nick's, with its friendly bartenders, old-school ambiance and decor little touched by the decades ... Changes are to be made gently here, if at all."

See also

 Coney Island (restaurant)
 List of hot dog restaurants

References

External links

 Nick's Famous Coney Island at Zomato

1935 establishments in Oregon
Hot dog restaurants in Oregon
Restaurants established in 1935
Restaurants in Portland, Oregon
Richmond, Portland, Oregon